TEMAX is a specialised manufacturer of fire and rescue vehicles, trailers and equipment based in Athens, Greece. Temax also manufactures snow-clearing equipment.

History 
Company activity effectively started in 1925, when Petros Tangalakis joined as a partner G. Tournikiotis, a vehicle body manufacturer based in Athens, founded in 1922. The new joint company saw significant growth becoming the largest in its field, producing a variety of vehicles on imported chassis. In 1934 Tangalakis split off creating his own company, which remained the leading Greek vehicle producer for nearly three decades, also briefly venturing into passenger car manufacture. During the Axis occupation of Greece in World War II the factory was put under German control, but vehicle production was resumed in 1945.

The following years were Tangalakis's "Golden Era"; the company (operating two factories in Athens) focused on all-metal bus construction on chassis by Studebaker, Daimler, Volvo and other manufacturers, producing several models remembered to this date (in some of which it introduced extensive chassis modification to accommodate higher loads and/or different vehicle dimensions). The company know-how was undoubtedly enriched through its assembly of Wayne models in the late 1940s and early 1950s.

In 1963, facing strong competition from other bus manufacturing companies in Greece, it ventured into fire-fighting vehicle manufacture mainly on International Harvester chassis (chassis assembled by Tangalakis from SKD kits). In 1965 Tangalakis family, Alexandros Ginis, Fanourios Gyrtatos & Antonis Kalogeropoulos created TEMAX, a new company entirely focused on fire-fighting and other specialty vehicle production, which operates successfully to date. Another branch of the original company, though, has continued business under the Tangalakis name, as importers and distributors of fire-fighting and rescue equipment, vehicle parts etc.

References 

L. S. Skartsis, "Greek Vehicle and Machine Manufacturers 1800 to Present: A Pictorial History", Marathon (2012) (eBook)
"P. Tangalakis", article in "To Volan" (Greek auto magazine), July 18, 1957
A. Chronis, "P. Tangalakis", article in "Pullman&Leoforeio" (Greek commercial vehicle magazine), September 1992
L.S. Skartsis and G.A. Avramidis, "Made in Greece", Typorama, Patras, Greece (2003)  (republished by the Patras Science Park, 2007) 
E. Roupa and E. Hekimoglou, "I istoria tou aftokinitou stin Ellada (History of automobile in Greece)", Kerkyra - Economia publishing, Athens (2009)

External links 
http://www.temax.gr
http://www.tangalakis.gr
Greek bus builders in Bus-planet.com

Gallery 

Bus manufacturers of Greece
Vehicle manufacturing companies established in 1925
Fire service vehicle manufacturers
Greek brands
Manufacturing companies based in Athens
Motor vehicle manufacturers of Greece
Firefighting in Greece
Greek companies established in 1925